Love Songs is a 1995 music album containing a compilation of Dan Fogelberg recordings, released by Epic Records.  It contains 10 previously released tracks:

Track listing
 "Heart Hotels" (4:14)
 "Hard to Say" (4:00)
 "Longer" (3:14)
 "Make Love Stay" (4:32)
 "Leader of the Band" (4:16)
 "Run for the Roses" (4:11)
 "Same Old Lang Syne" (5:19)
 "Lonely in Love" (5:27)
 "A Love Like This" (3:56)
 "Seeing You Again" (5:00)

References

1995 greatest hits albums
Dan Fogelberg albums
Epic Records compilation albums